Old Stone House is a historic home located near Winnsboro, Fairfield County, South Carolina.  It was built in 1784, and is a two-story, side-gable roofed, stone building, with a double-pile floor plan and stone end chimneys. The façade has a central door with a massive stone lintel flanked by single four-over-four windows with stone lintels.  It was built by Samuel Gladney (ca. 1740–1800) and in 1870 it was purchased by the Lebanon Presbyterian Church for use as a parsonage.

It was added to the National Register of Historic Places in 1984.

References

Houses on the National Register of Historic Places in South Carolina
Houses completed in 1784
Houses in Fairfield County, South Carolina
National Register of Historic Places in Fairfield County, South Carolina